is a Japanese rower. He competed in the men's coxed eight event at the 1968 Summer Olympics.

References

1948 births
Living people
Japanese male rowers
Olympic rowers of Japan
Rowers at the 1968 Summer Olympics
Sportspeople from Ishikawa Prefecture